The 1924 SIAA men's basketball tournament took place February 25–February 28, 1924, at . The Mercer Bears won their second Southern Intercollegiate Athletic Association title, led by head coach Tink Gillam.

Bracket

Championship

See also
List of SIAA basketball champions

References

Tournament
Southern Intercollegiate men's basketball tournament